Calceolaria frondosa is a species of plant in the Calceolariaceae family. It is endemic to Ecuador.

References

Endemic flora of Ecuador
frondosa
Endangered plants
Taxonomy articles created by Polbot